Nicholls may refer to:

 Nicholls (name), an English surname
 Nicholls State University (f. 1948), a Louisiana university named for Francis T. Nicholls
 Nicholls Colonels, the athletic program of said university
 Division of Nicholls, an electoral division in Victoria, Australia

Places
 Nicholls, Australian Capital Territory, Australia
 Nicholls, Georgia, United States